Rangan Chatterjee (born 1977) is a British physician, author, television presenter and podcaster. He is best known for his TV show Doctor in the House and for being the resident doctor on BBC Breakfast and as a regular contributor to BBC Radio.

Early life 
Chatterjee was raised in a medical family. His late father, Tarun Chatterjee, came to England from Kolkata, India in the 1960s and was a consultant in genito-urinary medicine at Manchester Royal Infirmary. Chatterjee was a pupil at Manchester Grammar School from 1988 to 1995; then he attended the University of Edinburgh, where he studied Medicine and graduated in 2001 with an additional degree in immunology.

Career
Chatterjee hosts the podcast "Feel Better, Live More," and has appeared on BBC Radio as a regular commentator. In 2017 he came 8th in the Pulse Power 50 list of influential GPs.

Books

  The 4 Pillar Plan Published on 28 December 2017
  How to Make Disease Disappear Released on May 22, 2018
  The Stress Solution Released on 27 December 2018.
Feel Better in 5 Released on 18 December 2019. 
  Feel Great Lose Weight released 31st December 2020
 Happy Mind, Happy Life: 10 Simple Ways to Feel Great Every DayReleased on 22nd February 2022.

Family 
Chatterjee is married to Vidhaata, a barrister, and has two children.

References

External links 
 
 

1977 births
Living people
21st-century British medical doctors
British writers
BBC Radio 2 presenters
British television presenters
British people of Indian descent